Cereopsius siamensis is a species of beetle in the family Cerambycidae. It was described by Stephan von Breuning in 1936. It is known from Thailand.

References

Cereopsius
Beetles described in 1936